Angraecopsis dolabriformis is an extinct species of plant in the family Orchidaceae. The sole known specimen was found in São Tomé. Its natural habitat has been destroyed by human activity since the 19th century and it was declared extinct in 2018.

References

Endemic orchids of Cameroon
Vulnerable plants
dolabriformis
Taxonomy articles created by Polbot